"Do I Love You (Indeed I Do)" is a song and single by American soul singer Frank Wilson first pressed in 1965 on the Motown subsidiary label Soul. It is Wilson's only Motown single and is a prized item among collectors.

Record history
Approximately 250 demo 45s of the song were pressed in 1965 and scheduled for release on 23 December 1965. Owing to a combination of Wilson deciding that he would rather focus on producing and Motown's Berry Gordy's lukewarm reception of the vocals and wish to prevent his producers from having a successful recording career, the demos were destroyed. At least two, and maybe as many as five, copies survived, one of which fetched £25,742 in May 2009. One is rumoured to be owned by Berry Gordy. Due to its scarcity it remains one of the most collectable discs especially by followers of Northern soul. Owing to the demand caused by it being played at the famous English Northern soul nightclub, Wigan Casino, it was first officially released in the UK in 1979 on the Tamla-Motown label, and again in 2004 with a version of the same song by Chris Clark on the B-side.

On CD, the mono Frank Wilson version was issued on The Complete Motown Singles, Volume 5: 1965 (Hip-O Select), while the stereo version appears on the British compilation This Is Northern Soul: The Motown Sound Volume 1 (Motown).  The Chris Clark version (in an alternate mono mix) was issued on the British "A Cellarful of Motown!", the first volume of four double discs documenting unreleased Motown songs.

Cover versions
 Bruce Springsteen, on his 2022 LP Only the Strong Survive. He also released it as a single.

Certifications

Popular culture
The song has featured in an commercials for KFC, and The Happy Egg Company.

References

1965 singles
1979 singles
2004 singles
Songs written by Frank Wilson (musician)
Motown singles
1965 songs
Northern soul songs
2022 singles
Bruce Springsteen songs